Mike Barber (born November 9, 1971 in Edgemoor, South Carolina) is a former American football linebacker in the National Football League. He was signed by the Seattle Seahawks as an undrafted free agent in 1995. He played college football at Clemson.

Barber also played for the Indianapolis Colts.

External links
Just Sports Stats

1971 births
Living people
American football linebackers
Clemson Tigers football players
Seattle Seahawks players
Indianapolis Colts players
New York/New Jersey Hitmen players